Durhamville may refer to:

Durhamville, New York, a hamlet in Oneida County
Durhamville, Tennessee, an unincorporated community in Lauderdale County